Lymm Rugby Football Club is an English rugby union team based in Lymm, Cheshire. The club runs six senior sides (including two colts teams) and a full range of junior sides, with the first XV currently playing in Regional 1 North West, a fifth tier league in the English rugby union system. The club also fields teams in squash and recently formed a hockey club.

Honours
Glengarth Sevens Davenport Plate winners: 1973
Cheshire Cup winners: 1989
North West 1 champions: 1995–96
North 1 West champions: 2009–10

References

External links
Official club website

English rugby union teams
Rugby clubs established in 1960
Sport in Warrington
Rugby union in Cheshire